All American City may refer to:

"All American City" (song), a song by Brutal Juice
All-America City Award, a designation from the National Civic League